Igder-e Olya (also Romanized as Īgder-e ‘Olyā; also known as Īgder-e Bālā and Īgūr-e Bālā) is a village in Fajr Rural District, in the Central District of Gonbad-e Qabus County, Golestan Province, Iran. At the 2006 census, its population was 1,391, in 269 families.

Igder olya is located between Gonbadeghaboos and Minoodasht. Haj Allah Gholi was last  Khan of this village who died fifty years ago.

People of this village are Turkmen and from Igder tribe.

References 

Populated places in Gonbad-e Kavus County